Ilias Michelidis (born 29 June 1976) is a retired Greek football midfielder.

References

1976 births
Living people
Greek footballers
Kavala F.C. players
Trikala F.C. players
Ethnikos Asteras F.C. players
Doxa Drama F.C. players
Aiolikos F.C. players
Paniliakos F.C. players
Association football midfielders
Super League Greece players